Kuykendall is a surname. Notable people with the surname include:

Andrew J. Kuykendall (1815–1891), U.S. Representative from Illinois
Dan Kuykendall (1924–2008), U.S. Representative from Tennessee from 1967 to 1975
Fulton Kuykendall (born 1953), former NFL football player
James Sloan Kuykendall (1878–1928), West Virginia House Delegate
Kathy Kuykendall (born 1956), retired American tennis player
Kurt Kuykendall (born 1952), retired American soccer goalkeeper
Laura Kuykendall (1883–1935), dean of women at Southwestern University from 1918 to 1935
Marlin Kuykendall, former mayor of Prescott, Arizona
Niija Kuykendall, Warner Bros. motion picture producer
Pete Kuykendall (1938–2017), American bluegrass musician, songwriter, discographer and magazine & music publisher
Ralph Simpson Kuykendall (1885–1963), American historian, trustee and secretary of the Hawaiian Historical Society from 1922 to 1932
Shawn Kuykendall (1982–2014), former American soccer player
Steven T. Kuykendall (1947–2021), American politician and former Republican member of the House of Representatives

See also
Kuykendall Polygonal Barn, in the South Branch Potomac River valley near Romney in Hampshire County, West Virginia
Wilson-Kuykendall Farm, historic home located near Moorefield, Hardy County, West Virginia
Kay Kendall (1927–1959), English actress